The Old Muhlenberg County Jail is a historic jail located on Court Row in Greenville, Kentucky. Built in 1912, the jail was the third used in Greenville. The stucco building was designed in the Mission Revival style. Its design features a red tile roof, a Mission-style dormer with a quatrefoil vent, and porches with hipped tile roofs over the entrances on three sides.

The jail was added to the National Register of Historic Places on August 15, 1985.

References

External links

Jails on the National Register of Historic Places in Kentucky
Mission Revival architecture in Kentucky
Government buildings completed in 1912
1912 establishments in Kentucky
National Register of Historic Places in Muhlenberg County, Kentucky
County government buildings in Kentucky
Greenville, Kentucky